The following are the national records in athletics in Jordan maintained by Jordan Athletics Federation (JAF).

Outdoor
Key to tables:

h = hand timing

dh = downhill course

A = affected by altitude

NWI = no wind information

Men

Women

Indoor

Men

Women

Notes

References

External links
 JAF web site 
 JAF web site 
 Jordanian Outdoor Records - Men
 Jordanian Outdoor Records - Women

Jordan
Records
Athletics
Athletics